Kisbarátpuszta is an uninhabited part of Szabadegyháza in the Subregion of Adony, Fejér County, Hungary.

Location 
It lies 5 km South-Southwest from the center of Szabadegyháza.

Demographics 
There was 1 house in the village with no inhabitant.

References 

Populated places in Fejér County